Tatarşa may refer to:

 Tatarşa, native name of Crimean Tatar language (in northern dialect; Dobruja) 

 Tatarşa, noun for Tatar language in Kazakh

 Noğay Tatarşa, native name of Nogai language (Dobruja)

See also 
 Tatarca (disambiguation)